Brooklee Han (born July 6, 1995) is an American-Australian retired figure skater who represented Australia in ladies' singles. She is the 2018 CS Alpen Trophy bronze medalist, the 2013 Volvo Open Cup champion, the 2013 Australian national champion, and a five-time Australian national silver medalist (2012, 2014–2018).

She placed 20th at the 2014 Winter Olympics.

Personal life 
Brooklee Han was born in Beverly, Massachusetts. In 2013, she graduated from Joel Barlow High School in Redding, Connecticut. Later that year, she became a part-time student at Wesleyan University. She studied international relations and German before taking a leave of absence in 2016 in order to train in Texas. Her father is Australian.

Born to parents who were both equestrians, Han has also competed in dressage and eventing. She began playing the violin at age five. She started a community orchestra in her town and volunteers teaching violin to grade school students.

Skating career 
Brooklee Han began skating at age five in Brewster, New York. Serhii Vaypan became her coach in 2007. Han has trained at the Newington Arena in Newington, Connecticut, the International Skating Center of Connecticut in Simsbury, Connecticut, and Medibank Icehouse in Melbourne, Victoria.

The 2013 Nebelhorn Trophy was the qualifying competition for the 2014 Winter Olympics for countries which had not qualified an entry in a figure skating discipline at the 2013 Worlds. In August 2013, Australian skater Chantelle Kerry argued before the Australian Court of Arbitration for Sport that Han should not compete at Nebelhorn Trophy because she did not compete at the inaugural Skate Down Under competition, which was used as the Australian qualification event to select skaters for the Nebelhorn Trophy. That claim was rejected and Han was selected to compete. Han finished fifth at the Nebelhorn Trophy and, as a result of her placement, Australia received one of the six remaining ladies' spots to the Olympics.

The dispute over the Olympic berth continued with claims that Han became ineligible after competing at a club event in America without the approval of the national federation. The Court of Arbitration for Sport heard the case in December 2013. Despite the court ruling that Han's participation could have led to her becoming ineligible, previous communications between the skater and Ice Skating Australia (ISA) showed that ISA had no objections to her competing in the event. The claim was ultimately rejected and Han was confirmed as Australia's ladies' representative at the Olympics. Han later finished 20th at the Olympics and 19th at the 2014 World Championships.

On June 27, 2014, Han was selected to compete at the 2014 Skate America, the first of six competitions in the 2014–15 Grand Prix series. After another skater withdrew, she was given a spot to the 2014 Skate Canada International. Han finished in 10th and 8th place, respectively.

In August 2016, Han relocated to Euless, Texas, to be coached by Peter Cain and Darlene Cain.

She announced her retirement from competitive skating on July 1, 2019.

Programs

Competitive highlights 
GP: Grand Prix; CS: Challenger Series; JGP: Junior Grand Prix

References

External links 

 
 Brooklee Han at Tracings

1995 births
Living people
Sportspeople from Beverly, Massachusetts
Australian female single skaters
Australian people of American descent
Figure skaters at the 2014 Winter Olympics
Olympic figure skaters of Australia
Sportspeople from Fairfield County, Connecticut
Sportspeople from New York (state)
People from Redding, Connecticut
People from Brewster, New York
American sportswomen